Rajesh S is an Indian professional footballer who plays as a striker.

Early life
Rajesh S was born in Pozhiyoor, a fishing hamlet at the southernmost tip of Kerala. His father and three brothers are fishermen. As a child, he was spotted by a local football coach who asked him to join the SMRC Pozhiyoor academy.

Career

Early career
Rajesh started his career at SMRC and played for SMRC and United Kerala in the Thiruvananthapuram Super Division. He later joined BEML, a club in Bangalore. He has represented Karnataka and Railways in the Santosh Trophy and has scored 28 goals in total in the tournament. He scored 8 goals in 2018 Santosh Trophy for Karnataka and was adjudged as the best footballer in the tournament.

Gokulam Kerala
Rajesh made his professional debut on 27 October 2018 against Mohun Bagan after coming on as a substitute in the second half. He played a part in his team's equalising goal and later forced a fingertip save from the keeper. He scored his first I-League goal against Shillong Lajong on 11 November, registering a 3-1 win for his club. In the next game he scored the solitary goal in a 1-0 win over defending champions Minerva Punjab.

References

External links
 

Living people
Indian footballers
Footballers from Kerala
Association football forwards
1992 births
Gokulam Kerala FC players